Mirab Este (Amharic: ምዕራብ እስቴ) is one of the woredas in the Amhara Region of Ethiopia. Part of the Debub Gondar Zone, Mirab Este is bordered on the south by the Abay River which separates

it from the Misraq Gojjam Zone and Mirab Gojjam Zone, on the west by Dera, and on the north and east by Misraq Este. Towns in Mirab Este include Jara Gedo.

Demographics
Based on the 2007 national census conducted by the Central Statistical Agency of Ethiopia (CSA), this woreda has a total population of 120,885, of whom 62,021 are men and 58,864 women; 2,192 or 1.81% are urban inhabitants. The majority of the inhabitants practiced Ethiopian Orthodox Christianity, with 98.61% reporting that as their religion, while 1.38% of the population said they were Muslim.

Notes

Districts of Amhara Region